Cham Chang is a village in Chama Rural District of the Central District of Saman County, Chaharmahal and Bakhtiari province, Iran. At the 2006 census, its population was 1,455 in 369 households. The following census in 2011 counted 1,648 people in 500 households. The latest census in 2016 showed a population of 1,881 people in 603 households; it was the largest village in its rural district. The village is populated by Persians.

References 

Saman County

Populated places in Chaharmahal and Bakhtiari Province

Populated places in Saman County